The  singles competition of the 2003 Hastings Direct International Championships was part of the 29th edition of the Eastbourne International tennis tournament, Tier II of the 2003 WTA Tour. Chanda Rubin was the defending champion and won in the final 6–4, 3–6, 6–4 against Conchita Martínez.

Seeds
A champion seed is indicated in bold text while text in italics indicates the round in which that seed was eliminated. The top four seeds received a bye to the second round.

  Lindsay Davenport (second round)
  Chanda Rubin (champion)
  Jennifer Capriati (semifinals)
  Daniela Hantuchová (quarterfinals)
  Anastasia Myskina (first round)
  Jelena Dokić (first round)
  Ai Sugiyama (second round)
  Magdalena Maleeva (quarterfinals)

Draw

Final

Top half

Bottom half

References

External links
 2003 Hastings Direct International Championships Draw

Singles
Hastings Direct International Championships